Bugayev (masculine) or Bugayeva (feminine), also transliterated as Bugaev, is a Russian surname. Notable people with the surname include:

Aleksei Bugayev (born 1981), Russian footballer
Boris Bugayev (1923–2007), Soviet aviator and politician
Roman Bugayev (born 1989), Russian footballer
Boris Pavlovich Bugaev, Soviet military pilot, politician and statesman
Nikolai Bugaev, Russian mathematician

See also
Andrei Bely, pseudonym of Boris Nikolaevich Bugaev, Russian novelist, poet, theorist, and literary critic
Bogayev

Russian-language surnames